Jyväskylän Seudun Palloseura (abbreviated JPS) is a sports club from Jyväskylä, Finland. The club was formed in 1962 and their home ground is at the Vehkalammen kenttä.

The men's football team currently plays in the Kolmonen (Third Division). The other main sporting activity run by the club is bandy. Their home ice is Viitaniemen tekojäärata and they play in Bandyliiga, the top league for bandy in Finland.

Bandy

JPS won the Finnish Cup in 2017.

The club has been playing in the national top-tier Bandyliiga for years and played the final for the Finnish Championship in 2014 but lost against Oulun Luistinseura. The club was awarded the bronze medal in 2017. In 2019 the national championship was won for the first time. Their home arena is the Viitaniemen kenttä.

Football

Season to season

Club Structure

Jyväskylän Seudun Palloseura run 1 men's team and 3 boys teams.

2010 season

JPS are competing in the Kolmonen administered by the Itä-Suomi SPL and Keski-Suomi SPL.  This is the fourth highest tier in the Finnish football system.  In 2009 JPS finished in tenth place in the Kolmonen.

JPS II are not running a side in the Vitonen in 2010.

Current squad

Footnotes

References and sources
Official Club Website
Finnish Wikipedia
Suomen Cup

Bandy clubs in Finland
Football clubs in Finland
Sport in Jyväskylä
Bandy clubs established in 1962
Association football clubs established in 1962
1962 establishments in Finland